Vasileia (Greek: Βασιλεία) is a Greek feminine given name that may refer to the following notable people:
Vasileia Karachaliou (born 1996), Greek laser radial sailor
Vasileia Mavrelou (born 1985), Greek water polo player 
Vasileia Zachou (born 1994), Greek group rhythmic gymnast

Greek feminine given names